Schimper Glacier is a glacier in the east part of Herbert Mountains, Shackleton Range, flowing north-northeast into Slessor Glacier. Photographed from the air by the U.S. Navy, 1967, and surveyed by British Antarctic Survey (BAS), 1968–71. In association with the names of glacial geologists grouped in the area, named by the United Kingdom Antarctic Place-Names Committee (UK-APC) after Karl Friedrich Schimper (1803–67), German botanist who in 1835 originated the theory of the Ice Age in Europe to account for the distribution of erratic boulders.

See also
 List of glaciers in the Antarctic
 Glaciology

References
 

Glaciers of Coats Land